William Leggett (April 30, 1801 – May 29, 1839) was an American poet, fiction writer, and journalist.

Life
William Leggett's father was Major Abraham Leggett, who served in the Continental Army from 1776–1783.  Modern-day Leggett Street in The Bronx is named after Abraham.  William's mother, Catherine Wiley (1784–1839) of New Rochelle, was Major Leggett's second wife.  The couple had 9 children, of which William was the 8th.

Leggett attended Georgetown College in 1815–16. In 1819, after his father's business failed, he moved with his family to Edwardsville, Illinois. In late 1822, he returned to New York to take up a naval commission as a midshipman. He served in the United States Navy in the West Indies and Mediterranean.

In January 1825, Leggett was imprisoned by his captain for dueling on duty.  Several months later, a court martial convicted him of several offenses.  His sentence of dismissal from the navy was reduced to time served, but he resigned his commission on April 17, 1826.

After his resignation, Leggett returned to New York to become a theater critic at the New York Mirror and assistant editor of the short-lived Merchants' Telegraph. In November 1828, he founded the Critic, a literary journal that lasted only until June 1829. In the summer of 1829, however, William Cullen Bryant invited Leggett to write for the New York Evening Post. There, in addition to literary and drama reviews, he began to write political editorials. Leggett became an owner and editor at the Post in 1831, eventually working as sole editor of the newspaper while Bryant traveled in Europe in 1834–5.

Leggett's political opinions proved highly controversial.  He was a Jacksonian Democrat, but he often attacked fellow Andrew Jackson supporters for failing to carry their egalitarian principles far enough. He also became an outspoken opponent of slavery.  Because the resulting struggles threatened both Leggett's health and the financial survival of the newspaper, Bryant returned from Europe, and Leggett left the Post. Leggett founded The Plaindealer in 1836 and the Examiner in 1837, but both publications lasted only a few months. Their failure left Leggett in poverty.

Leggett had suffered poor health since contracting yellow fever in the navy.  He died at his home in New Rochelle, New York on May 29, 1839, just before he was due to begin serving as the American minister to Guatemala under Martin Van Buren. He is interred at New Rochelle's Trinity Church.  His monument there was carved by John Frazee.

Positions
He is best known as an unflinching advocate of laissez-faire, and a leader of the Loco-Focos faction of city Democrats. He insisted:

Governments have no right to interfere with the pursuits of individuals, as guaranteed by those general laws, by offering encouragements and granting privileges to any particular class of industry, or any select bodies of men, inasmuch as all classes of industry and all men are equally important to the general welfare, and equally entitled to protection.

Leggett was remarkable among the journalists of his day as an unflinching advocate of freedom of opinion for his political opponents as well as for his own party. Bryant wrote a poem to his memory, beginning "The earth may ring from shore to shore." Bryant describes Leggett as fond of study, delighting to trace principles to their remotest consequences, and having no fear of public opinion regarding the expression of his own convictions. It was the fiery Leggett that urged on Bryant to attack William Leete Stone, Sr., a brother editor, in Broadway. Soon afterward he fought a duel at Weehawken with Blake, the treasurer of the old Park Theatre. To the surprise of all New York, Leggett selected James Lawson, a peacefully disposed Scottish-American poet, who was slightly lame, as his second; and when asked after the bloodless duel for his reasons, he answered: "Blake's second, Berkeley, was lame, and I did not propose that the d--d Englishman should beat me in anything."

William Cullen Bryant, in his obituary, wrote:

Writings
Leggett's writings include Leisure Hours at Sea (1825); Tales and Sketches of a Country School Master (1835); Naval Stories (1835); and Political Writings, edited, with a preface, by Theodore Sedgwick (1840).  Tales and Sketches of a Country School Master includes "The Rifle" (originally in The Atlantic Souvenir, Christmas and New Year's Offering [1827]), an early pre-Poe use of elements that would appear in detective fiction.

His main editorials have been collected as Democratick Editorials: Essays in Jacksonian Political Economy (1984)

In popular culture
 Leggett appears in the novel Burr by Gore Vidal as a mentor to the main character, aspiring journalist Charlie Schuyler.
 A poem was written by John Greenleaf Whittier commemorating "Leggett's Monument" as a symbol of his consistently outspoken nature and the callousness of society to his opinions.

See also
 Locofocos

References

Further reading
 Hofstadter, Richard. "William Leggett:  Spokesman of Jacksonian Democracy."  Political Science Quarterly 58#4 (December 1943):  581–94.  in JSTOR
 
 Leggett, William.  (Edited and foreword by Lawrence H. White) Democratick Editorials: Essays in Jacksonian Political Economy (1834). Indianapolis: Liberty Fund, 1984.
 
 Simeone, James. "Reassessing Jacksonian Political Culture: William Leggett's Egalitarianism." American Political Thought 4#3 (2015): 359–90. in JSTOR
 Sklansky, Jeffrey. "The Melodrama of Panic: William Leggett and the Literary Logic of Jacksonian Political Economy." Presented at the Program in Early American Economy and Society. Philadelphia: Library Company of Philadelphia, 2007.
 
 

This article was based on one in Appleton's Cyclopedia of American Biography, edited by James Grant Wilson, John Fiske and Stanley L. Klos. Six volumes, New York: D. Appleton and Company, 1887–1889, now in the public domain.

External links
 A Collection of the Political Writings of William Leggett, Vol. I.
 A Collection of the Political Writings of William Leggett, Vol. II.
 "Leggett's Monument", John Greenleaf Whittier.

1801 births
1839 deaths
American libertarians
American male non-fiction writers
American political writers
Georgetown University alumni
New York (state) Jacksonians
19th-century American politicians
Writers from New York City
Writers from New Rochelle, New York